Tverskoy (masculine), Tverskaya (feminine), or Tverskoye (neuter) may refer to:
Tverskoy District, a district in Central Administrative Okrug of the federal city of Moscow, Russia
Tverskoy Boulevard, one of the main thoroughfares in central Moscow
Tver Oblast (Tverskaya oblast), a federal subject of Russia
Tverskaya Street, a street in Moscow, Russia
Tverskaya (Moscow Metro), a station on the Zamoskvoretskaya Line of the Moscow Metro, Moscow, Russia
Tverskoy, Russia (Tverskaya, Tverskoye), several rural localities in Russia
Tverskoye, former name of Şirinbəyli, a village in Azerbaijan
Julia Tverskaya (born 1959), Moscow born American chess player

See also
Tver